The following is a list of cities and towns in Malaysia by population according to the latest national census, which was conducted in 2020.

Populations by cities and towns proper

The following is a list of cities and municipalities, based on the populations within the local government areas according to the 2020 National Census.

Largest urban agglomerations
The following is a list of 10 largest urban agglomerations, metropolitan areas or conurbations, based on data from the 2020 National Census within local government areas.Also included for comparison are the populations within the districts (2010 census data) which are fully or partially covered by the urban agglomerations.

See also
 Cities of Malaysia
 List of capitals in Malaysia
 List of cities in Malaysia by population

References

Malaysia, population
Malaysia, population
Cities by population